Field dressing can refer to:

 Field dressing (bandage), also known as a battle dressing
 Field dressing (hunting)